James Le Duc is Professor of Microbiology and Immunology and Director at University of Texas Medical Branch, and Director of the Galveston National Laboratory, one of the largest active biocontainment facilities in the United States.

References

External links
https://www.c-span.org/person/?91464/JamesLeDuc

Living people
American microbiologists
University of Texas Medical Branch faculty
Year of birth missing (living people)